Mutya ng Pilipinas (MNP), in 2019 known as Mutya Pilipinas, is one of the two oldest annual national beauty pageants in the Philippines (est. 1968). The other being the Binibining Pilipinas pageant (est. 1964). Due to the COVID-19 pandemic, the competition was not held in 2020 and 2021.

History 
The Mutya ng Pilipinas beauty pageant has produced:
 Five Miss Asia Pacific titles: Maria del Carmen Ines Zaragoza in 1982, Gloria Dimayacyac in 1983, Lorna Legaspi in 1989, Michelle Aldana in 1993, and Sharifa Akeel in 2018.
 Five Miss Tourism International titles: Maria Esperanza Corazon Manzano in  2000–2001, Rizzini Alexis Gomez in  2012–2013, Angeli Dione Gomez in 2013–2014, Jannie Loudette Alipo-on in 2017–2018, and Cyrille Payumo in 2019-2020.
Three Miss Tourism Queen of the Year International titles: Sherylle Lynne Santarin in 1996, Racquel Uy in 1999, and Leren Mae Bautista in 2015.
 One Miss Tourism Cosmopolitan International: Barbara Salvador in 2010.
 One Miss Tourism Metropolitan International: Glennifer Perido in 2014.
 One Beauty of the World title: April Love Jordan in 2009.

From 1977–1991 Mutya ng Pilipinas Asia and Mutya ng Pilipinas World competed in 2 international beauty pageants such as Miss Asia Pacific International and Miss World. The runners-up compete in Miss Wonderland International, Miss Tourism International, Miss Intercontinental, Queen of Clubs International, Queen of the Year and Miss Expo International.

One of the titles of Mutya ng Pilipinas, which was first named Mutya ng Pilipinas Asia has undergone name changes starting from 1965 until 1983 for the Miss Asia Quest. Then it was renamed Mutya ng Pilipinas Asia Pacific for Miss Asia Pacific Quest from 1984 until 2004. In 2005, the title was renamed once again to Mutya ng Pilipinas Asia Pacific International for Miss Asia Pacific International Quest. Then in 2006, the Miss Asia Pacific International pageant was completely & officially scrapped with the national titlist nowhere to compete internationally and was retained for 3 years. The winner in 2006 was sent to Miss Intercontinental and in 2007 to Miss Tourism Metropolitan International.

The Mutya organizers finally changed the title to Mutya ng Pilipinas International in 2008 as the top winner and the second winner as Mutya ng Pilipinas Tourism. In 2010, the top prize received the title of Mutya ng Pilipinas Tourism International and the co-winners with the titles of Mutya ng Pilipinas Intercontinental & Asia Pacific International.

In 2014, Miss Intercontinental Philippines delegates are no longer selected by Mutya ng Pilipinas Organization.

In 2018, the primary winners of the pageant namely Mutya ng Pilipinas Asia Pacific International, Mutya ng Pilipinas Tourism International, Mutya ng Pilipinas Tourism Queen of the Year International, and Mutya ng Pilipinas Global Beauty Queen.

In 2019 (on its 51st year), the franchise and leadership was handed over to Cory Quirino who is now the President of re-branded Mutya Pilipinas, Inc. and Fred Yuson as the Chairman of the Board of the Mutya Pilipinas, Inc. Organization.

On July 27, 2022, a press conference was held in BGC (Bonifacio Global City), Taguig with the organization reverting back to its former honored and dignified name of Mutya ng Pilipinas. In its 52nd year, with the collaboration of the dynamic-duo of Cory Quirino and Fred Yuson, a newly-conceptualized international pageant is to emerge later this year titled Miss Mutya International. This pageant will objectify the vast culture and heritage of the Philippines which will be conveyed to the rest of the world in its inauguration and in its ensuing years. Furthermore, the Mutya ng Pilipinas Organization and its global pageant elaborated its core principles and mantra of inclusivity and sustainability.

(Mutya (n.) means or synomous to 1. jewel; 2. pearl; 3. charm; 4. darling; 5. amulet.)

In 2023, the organizers will be launching the newest international pageant christened as Miss Mutya International with its concept closely-analogous to the erstwhile Miss Maja International (held in Spain) which was later renamed to Miss Maja del Mundo (Miss Maja of the World) until its last episode in 1995. Maja (fem.) for nice girl in Spanish was distinguished in Madrid back in the 18th century were the Maja wore elaborate traditional Spanish dresses/outfits. The Maja was the frequent subject of painter Francisco Goya and became one of the popular and informal symbols of Spain. Miss Mutya International (translated as Miss Jewel International or Miss Pearl International) will showcase the Philippines' tourism, costumes, customs, culture, and traditions to the rest of the world.

The current national winner, Iona Violeta Abrera Gibbs, was crowned as Mutya ng Pilipinas on December 4, 2022. She will be the Philippines' flag-bearer at the first Miss Mutya International pageant to be held at undisclosed date.

Titleholders

Current Franchises

Miss Mutya International 

(Mutya (n.) means or synomous to 1. jewel; 2. pearl; 3. charm; 4. darling; 5. amulet.)

This will be the launching of the newest international pageant christened as Miss Mutya International with its concept analogous to the erstwhile Miss Maja International (held in Spain), for which later became Miss Maja del Mundo (translated as Miss Maja of the World which was moved to South America) until its final stages in 1995. Miss Mutya International will showcase the Philippines' tourism, costumes, customs, culture, and traditions to the rest of the world.

Miss Intercontinental

World Top Model

Miss Tourism International

Miss Asia Pacific International

Top Model of the World

Miss Environment International

Special Title

Mutya ng Pilipinas — Overseas Communities

See also

Binibining Pilipinas
Miss Philippines Earth
Miss Republic of the Philippines
Miss World Philippines
Philippines at major beauty pageants
List of beauty contests

Notes

  There was no Miss Asia Pacific Int'l pageant in 2004 which made Jedah wait the following year at the 2005 Miss Asia Pacific International pageant in China.
  Miss Asia Pacific International pageant in China placing 4th runner-up. Miss Intercontinental 2004 delegate was Jamie Burgos who placed Top 12 was handpicked by a US-based Filipino pageant organizer.
  Last year's Mutya ng Pilipinas Asia Pacific Int'l, Jedah Hernandez was sent to Miss Asia Pacific Int'l 2005 pageant which left Maria Carmeniezinas without a pageant to compete. Miss Asia Pacific International was finally discontinued in 2006. Miss Intercontinental 2005 delegate was Mutya 4th runner-up, Namkeen Hameed who was unplaced.
  Miss Asia Pacific International 2006 discontinued completely. Competed in 2006 Miss Intercontinental placing Top 12 semifinalist.
 Abdicated her crown and title & replaced by co-winner Mutya ng Pilipinas Tourism International, Ana Marie Pulpulaan Morelos for the 2007 Miss Tourism Metropolitan International placing 4th runner-up. Miss Tourism International title not given this year and replaced by the title Miss Tourism Metropolitan International. There was no Miss Intercontinental 2007 delegate.
 Unable to compete internationally in 2008 and had to wait the following year for Miss Tourism International 2009 but was unplaced. Switched international pageants joined in 2009 with Jacqueline Schubert, Mutya ng Pilipinas Tourism. There was no Miss Intercontinental 2008 delegate.
 Did not compete at Miss Intercontinental 2009 w/ reason unknown. Replaced by her co-winner, Mutya ng Pilipinas Tourism 2009, Jacqueline Schubert who was our Miss Intercontinental 2009 delegate but was unplaced.
 Did not compete due to family situation & replaced by Christi Lynn McGarry who competed at 2010 Miss Intercontinental placing Top 15 semifinalist. Replaced Carla Jenina Lizardo in representing at 2010 Miss Intercontinental placing Top 15 semifinalist. There was no Miss Asia Pacific Int'l pageant held in 2010 nor in the last 5 years.
 Unable to compete at Miss Intercontinental 2011 due to national pageant delayed until 2 December. Miss Intercontinental Pageant 2011 was held 7 Oct and The Philippines' delegate to Miss Intercontinental (Kathleen Anne Po) had to be swiftly handpicked by a US-based Filipino pageant organizer. Miss Po was unplaced
 Competed in 2012 Miss Intercontinental but was unplaced. There was no Miss Asia Pacific Int'l pageant held in 2012 nor in the last 7 years.
 No Miss Asia Pacific International she will compete at Top Model of the World 2015 in Egypt.
 Fourth runner-up Miss Tourism Metropolitan International 2007. No Miss Tourism International pageant held this year
 The original Mutya ng Pilipinas International (for Miss Intercontinental), was unable to compete internationally. Co-winner Mutya ng Pilipinas Tourism (for Miss Tourism International), Jacqueline Schubert assumed Miss Bañares spot.
 Assumed Miss Bañares spot and switched international pageants, Jane Bañares' replacement. Miss Tourism International 2009/2010.
 Assumed Miss Bañares spot and switched international pageants competed with last years Mutya ng Pilipinas International, Jonavi Raisa Quiray who was Jane Bañares' replacement. Miss Intercontinental 2009.Unplaced
 Did not compete due to schedule conflict. Competed in Sentosa, Singapore on 6 February 2012 and won Miss Sentosa. However it is not considered a major title. Mutya ng Pilipinas 2011 pageant finals was held on 2 December giving Dianne just a few days to prepare prior to departure for her international competition on 31 December.

References

External links
 Mutya ng Pilipinas Official website

 
Beauty pageants in the Philippines
Philippine awards
Recurring events established in 1968